Woitape Airport is an airfield serving Woitape, in the Central Province of Papua New Guinea.

Airlines and destinations

References

External links
 

Airports in Papua New Guinea
Central Province (Papua New Guinea)